Thiobacillus denitrificans is a Gram-negative, obligate chemolithoautotroph. It was originally discovered by Martinus Beijerinck in 1904.

Metabolism 
T. denitrificans is particularly notable for its ability to oxidize sulfur and uranium compounds in a nitrate-dependent manner.

Genetics 
The genome of T. denitrificans has been sequenced. The genome is a single circular chromosome consisting of 2.9 Mbps and with a GC-content of 66.1%.

References

External links 
T. denitrificans genome sequence from NCBI.
Type strain of Thiobacillus denitrificans at BacDive -  the Bacterial Diversity Metadatabase

Betaproteobacteria